The year 1918 in architecture involved some significant architectural events and new buildings.

Events
 November 3 – A Baroque Marian column (built 1650) in Prague, the Czech Republic, is destroyed by nationalists.
 December 3 – The November Group (Novembergruppe) of expressionist artists and architects is formed in Germany, and shortly afterwards merges with the Arbeitsrat für Kunst.

Buildings and structures

Buildings
 Hallidie Building is built in San Francisco. Designed by Willis Polk. Credited as the first glass curtain wall building.
 D. L. James House is built in Carmel Highlands, California. Designed by Greene and Greene in an Arts and Crafts style.
 Copenhagen Police Headquarters are begun in Denmark. Designed by Hack Kampmann in a Neoclassical style.
 Our Lady of the Victories Basilica in Melbourne, Australia is completed.
 Newman College in Melbourne, Australia designed by Walter Burley Griffin, is completed.
 The Chapel of St. James, of the Archbishop Quigley Preparatory Seminary in Chicago, designed by Zachary Taylor Davis, in the French Gothic style, is completed.
 Woodland Chapel in Skogskyrkogården Cemetery is built in Stockholm, Sweden. Designed by Erik Gunnar Asplund.
 Snellman House in Djursholm, Sweden, is built. Designed by Erik Gunnar Asplund.

Awards
 RIBA Royal Gold Medal – Ernest Newton.
 Grand Prix de Rome, architecture: not held.

Births

 February 1 – Minnette de Silva, Ceylonese modernist architect (died 1998)
 March 16 – Aldo van Eyck, Dutch architect (died 1999)
 April 10 – Jørn Utzon, Danish architect best known for Sydney Opera House (died 2008)
 July 3 – Benjamin C. Thompson, American architect (died 2002)
 October 23 – Paul Rudolph, American architect and academic (died 1997)
 December 16 – Gerard Goalen, English Catholic church architect (died 1999)

Deaths
 April 11 – Otto Wagner, Austrian architect and urban planner (born 1841)
 May 25 – William Pitt, Australian architect, public servant and politician (born 1855)
 October 25 – Zsigmond Quittner, Hungarian commercial architect (died 1859)

References